Bahama was a 74-gun ship of the line of the Spanish Navy. She was built in Havana on plans originally drawn by Ignacio Mullan for the 64-gun , completed as a project of Gautier. She was later rebuilt as a 74-gun.

Career 
In 1784, Bahama was under Captain Félix del Corral y Jaime, with Commander Francisco de la Bodega y Cuadra as first officer. She departed Havana on 5 January 1785 in the fleet under Admiral Francisco de Borja, bound for Cadiz, where she arrived on 2 March.

On 3 June 1788, she entered drydock number 3 of Carraca arsenal for a refit and rebuilt as a 74-gun.

Battle of Trafalgar 

Bahama took part in the Battle of Trafalgar on 21 October 1805, under Commodore Dionisio Alcalá Galiano. She was part of the vanguard of the Franco-Spanish fleet, at the 6th position in the second division of the reconnaissance squadron under Admiral Gravina, and came under intense fire from British ships. Bahama suffered 75 killed and 65 wounded, among whom Galiano, who died from his wounds after a cannonball struck him.

The British captured Bahama and sailed her to Gibraltar for repairs. She then sailed to England, where she was hulked and used as a prison ship. She was scrapped in Chatham in 1814.

Notes

References

Bibliography

 
 
 
 Militares y Navíos Españoles que participaron en Trafalgar (1) de Luís Aragón Martín 
 Militares y Navíos Españoles que participaron en Trafalgar (2) de Luís Aragón Martín

External links
 Batalla de Trafalgar, página web del bicentenario

1783 ships
Ships built in Spain
Ships of the line of the Spanish Navy